Wojciech Jan Borowik (24 June 1956 – 22 December 2020) was a Polish politician.

Biography
Born in Warsaw, he served as a member of the Sejm from 1993 to 1997, with the Labour Union Party, of which he was one of the founders. In the early 1990s, Borowik served as parliament secretary for the Labour Solidarity Party. In 2015, he was awarded the Cross of Freedom and Solidarity.

Borowik died from COVID-19 on 22 December 2020, at age 64, during the COVID-19 pandemic in Poland.

References

1956 births
2020 deaths
Members of the Polish Sejm 1993–1997
Deaths from the COVID-19 pandemic in Poland
Politicians from Warsaw
University of Warsaw alumni
Labour Union (Poland) politicians
Recipients of the Order of Polonia Restituta